Lilli Wislicenus, born Elisabeth Emma Charlotte Finzelberg (1872–1939) was a German sculptor.

Biography
Wislicenus née Finzelberg was born in 1872 in Andernach. For a time she lived with her uncle, the painter Hermann Wislicenus in Duesseldorf. She attended the Königlich Technische Hochschule Charlottenburg (Technical University of Berlin). 
 
She  exhibited her work at the Woman's Building at the 1893 World's Columbian Exposition in Chicago, Illinois.

In 1896 she married her cousin, the German painter  (1864–1939).

Wislicenus died in 1939 in Berlin, Germany.

References

Further reading
 Klaus Schäfer: "Notizen zu Leben und Werk der Bildhauerin Lilli Wislicenus-Finzelberg". In: Andernacher Annalen, Vol.8, Historischer Verein Andernach e.V., 2009, pp. 139–155
 "Wislicenus, Lilli", In: Hans Vollmer (Ed.): Allgemeines Lexikon der Bildenden Künstler von der Antike bis zur Gegenwart, Vol.36: Wilhelmy–Zyzywi. E. A. Seemann, Leipzig 1947, pg.108

External links
 
More works by Wislicenus @ ArtNet

1872 births
1939 deaths
German women sculptors
19th-century German women artists
20th-century German women artists
19th-century German sculptors
20th-century German sculptors
People from Andernach